Donnchadh mac Eoghan Ó Duinnshléibhe (died 30 September 1527) was an Irish physician and the ollam leighis or official physician of the O'Donnell dynasty.

Ó Duinnshléibhe was a member of a hereditary medical family based in County Donegal who were formerly the ruling dynasty of the over-kingdom of Ulaid. The Annals of the Four Masters contain his obit, sub anno 1527:

 The physician O'Donlevy (Donough, son of Owen), a Doctor of Medicine, and learned in other sciences, a man of great affluence and wealth, who kept a house of general hospitality, died on the 30th of September.

His son Eoghan MacDonlevy, M.D. (d. 1586) or Owen Ultach was like his father educated in the medical arts in Paris, like his father an ollam leighis to the O’Donnell, and likewise known for his general learning.  Owen was considered the finest physician of his time in Ireland.

See also
 Irish medical families
 Muiris mac Donnchadh Ulltach Ó Duinnshléibhe, Irish cleric, fl. 1602-1630s
 Muiris mac Seaán Ulltach Ó Duinnshléibhe, Irish cleric, fl. 1602-1630s.

References

External links
 http://celt.ucc.ie/publishd.html

16th-century Irish medical doctors
People from County Donegal
1527 deaths
Year of birth unknown
Irish Latinists